The Atholl Arms Hotel is a hotel and restaurant in Dunkeld, Perth and Kinross, Scotland. Standing at the corner of Bridge Street and Boat Road, it is a Category B listed building dating to 1833.

Gallery

See also
 List of listed buildings in Dunkeld And Dowally, Perth and Kinross

References

External links

Listed buildings in Dunkeld
Hotel buildings completed in 1833
Listed hotels in Scotland
Category B listed buildings in Perth and Kinross
1833 establishments in Scotland
Hotels in Perth and Kinross